Brian Alan Chisholm (born November 7, 1970) is an American politician. He is a Republican representing District 31B in the Maryland House of Delegates.

Early life and education 
Chisholm was born in Madison, Wisconsin, and graduated from Severna Park High School in Severna Park, Maryland. He holds a Bachelor of Arts degree in Marketing from Clemson University.

Political career 
Chisholm was a member of the Pension Oversight Commission of Anne Arundel County, Maryland from 2015 to 2018. He was vice-chair of the commission from 2017 to 2018.

In 2014, Chisholm ran for election to one of two District 31B seats in the Maryland House of Delegates, but came in fourth in a field of eight candidates in the Republican primary. On October 19, 2017, he announced that he would again run for the House of Delegates, and, together with incumbent and fellow Republican Nic Kipke, won. He is running for re-election in 2022.

As of June 2022, Chisholm is a member of the following committees:
 Health and Government Operations Committee (government Operations & estates & trusts subcommittee, public health & minority health disparities subcommittee, government operations & health facilities subcommittee)
 Anne Arundel County Delegation (public health subcommittee, education subcommittee, alcohol subcommittee)

Personal life
Chisholm currently lives in Severna Park, Maryland and works as a mortgage banker. He is married and has one child.

Chisholm co-owns, with Delegate Sid Saab, a fitness gym in Severna Park. In February 2021, a former employee filed a lawsuit against the two lawmakers, alleging that she was retaliated against for reporting sexual harassment by another co-worker.

Political positions

COVID-19 pandemic
In April 2020, Chisholm sent a letter to the Maryland Department of Health asking the agency to publicly release more information about COVID-19 outbreaks in elder care facilities.

In May 2020, Chisholm attended a Reopen Maryland rally to protest COVID-19 restrictions put into place through executive orders by Governor Larry Hogan.

Chisholm introduced legislation during the 2021 legislative session that would provide a property tax credit to businesses in Anne Arundel County that were affected by the state's COVID-19 emergency declarations. The bill received a favorable report from the Anne Arundel County Delegation, but stalled in committee.

Criminal justice
In July 2020, Chisholm organized a "Back the Blue" rally in Annapolis, which he said was separate from the Black Lives Matter movement.

In 2021, Chisholm opposed legislation that would remove the governor of Maryland from the Maryland Parole Commission, and introduced an amendment that would require inmates serving a life sentence to get "unanimous agreement" from the state's parole board to be released. His amendment was rejected in a 91–41 vote.

Elections
In 2021, Chisholm opposed legislation that would allow register voters to opt-in to an absentee ballot list instead of reapplying for mail-in ballots before statewide elections, introducing an amendment that would require voters to have a government-issued ID to vote. His amendment was rejected.

Taxes
In 2021, Chisholm opposed legislation that would allow Maryland counties to set up a progressive income tax, introducing an amendment that would have required counties to lower the tax on lower income brackets if officials opt to increase the tax for higher income brackets. His amendment was rejected.

Electoral history

References 

1970 births
Living people
Politicians from Madison, Wisconsin
People from Severna Park, Maryland
Businesspeople from Maryland
Clemson University alumni
Republican Party members of the Maryland House of Delegates
21st-century American politicians